J. Dewey Daane (July 6, 1918 – January 3, 2017) was an American economist and banker who served as a member of the Federal Reserve Board of Governors from 1963 to 1974. After leaving the Fed, Daane was also a chaired professor at Vanderbilt University since 1974. 

He received an M.P.A. and D.P.A. from Harvard University. He died on January 3, 2017, at the age of 98.

Footnotes

External links
Faculty Directory page on the Vanderbilt University website
Statements and Speeches of J. Dewey Daane
Bio on the Federal Reserve System website

1918 births
2017 deaths
American economists
Duke University alumni
Federal Reserve System governors
Harvard Kennedy School alumni
Vanderbilt University alumni
Vanderbilt University faculty
Lyndon B. Johnson administration personnel
Nixon administration personnel